"Traffic" is a track single which appeared in the album Just Be and Parade of the Athletes by Dutch DJ Tiësto. The track contains samples of Sean Deason's track "Psykofuk". When the album Just Be was released, his third single "Love Comes Again" was featured with it, "Traffic" turned into a B-side after having great success in Tiësto's concerts and having a music video made which was released in its original form as well as its radio edit version. It is the first instrumental track to reach the top spot in his homeland of the Netherlands in 23 years. Many DJs did remixes for "Traffic". The track is recorded at 136 BPM.

An official remake by the duo "twoloud" was released on Musical Freedom in December 2013.

Another remake for the song by "Jewelz & Sparks" was released on Musical Freedom in July 2020.

Formats and track listings

CD and 12" vinyl
Netherlands, Scandinavia, and United Kingdom maxi-single
 "Traffic" 
 "Traffic" 
 "Traffic"

"Love Comes Again" and "Traffic"
Australia 12" vinyl
 "Love Comes Again" 
 "Love Comes Again" 
 "Traffic" 
 "Traffic" 

Australia maxi-single
 "Love Comes Again" 
 "Love Comes Again" 
 "Love Comes Again" 
 "Traffic" 
 "Traffic" 
 "Traffic"

Charts

Weekly charts

Year-end charts

Decade-end charts

Official versions
 Just Be Album Version – (5:24)
 Parade of the Athletes Album Version – (4:13)
 Max Walder Mix – (7:34)
 DJ Montana 12" Edit – (7:49)
 DJ Montana Re-Edit – (5:11)
 Original Mix – (6:57)
 Radio Edit – (2:54)
Sied van Riel Remix – (5:55)

Release history

References

Tiësto songs
2004 songs
2004 singles
Songs written by Tiësto